Prema Purao is an Indian social worker, freedom fighter and the founder of Annapurna Mahila Mandal, a non governmental organization working for the empowerment of destitute women and children. She was involved in the Goa liberation movement and founded Annapurna Mahila Mandal in 1975. A recipient of the AIWEFA Stree Ratna Award, Purao was honored by the Government of India, in 2002, with the fourth highest Indian civilian award of Padma Shri

See also

 Goa liberation movement

References

Recipients of the Padma Shri in social work
Social workers
Social workers from Goa
Goa liberation activists
Living people
20th-century Indian educational theorists
Women educators from Goa
Educators from Goa
20th-century Indian women politicians
Women in Goa politics
20th-century Indian politicians
1935 births
20th-century women educators